G700 may refer to:

 Gulfstream G700, a jet aircraft
 Ricoh G700, a digital compact camera
 Sony Ericsson G700, a mobile phone